Zanclognatha is a genus of litter moths of the family Erebidae. The genus was erected by Julius Lederer in 1857.

Taxonomy
Zanclognatha was considered synonym of Polypogon in 1989. It became its own genus in 1991, but then became a synonym of Polypogon again in 1996. However, sources from 1998 and 2005 recommend keeping the two genera split.

It is not clear how many valid species are part of the genus; some species are likely made up of at least two valid species-level taxa that have yet to be officially split, and there are some familiar taxa that have not yet been described to science. Adult Zanclognatha species are often difficult to tell apart; wing patterns and genital morphology, two characters often used to distinguish moth species, are not necessarily useful for classifying them. The larvae are more distinctive and may be more helpful in future studies of the genus.

Species
Zanclognatha angulina (Leech, 1900)
Zanclognatha atrilineella (Grote, 1873)
Zanclognatha bryanti Barnes, 1928
Zanclognatha cruralis (Guenée, 1854) - early zanclognatha moth
Zanclognatha dentata Wagner & McCabe, 2011 - Coastal Plain zanclognatha moth
Zanclognatha helva (Butler, 1879)
Zanclognatha inspidalis (Wileman, 1915)
Zanclognatha jacchusalis (Walker, 1859) - wavy-lined zanclognatha moth
Zanclognatha laevigata (Grote, 1872) - variable zanclognatha moth
Zanclognatha lituralis (Hübner, 1818) - lettered zanclognatha moth
Zanclognatha lunalis (Scopoli, 1763) - jubilee fan-foot
Zanclognatha marcidilinea (Walker, 1859) - yellowish zanclognatha moth
Zanclognatha martha Barnes, 1928 - pine barrens zanclognatha moth, Martha's zanclognatha moth
Zanclognatha minoralis J. B. Smith, 1895
Zanclognatha nakatomii Owada, 1977
Zanclognatha nigrisigna (Wileman, 1915)
Zanclognatha obscuripennis (Grote, 1872) - dark zanclognatha moth
Zanclognatha pedipilalis (Guenée, 1854) - grayish zanclognatha moth
Zanclognatha protumnusalis (Walker, 1859) - conifer zanclognatha moth
Zanclognatha reticulatis (Leech, 1900)
Zanclognatha subtriplex Strand, 1919
Zanclognatha tarsipennalis (Treitschke, 1835)
Zanclognatha theralis (Walker, 1859) (syn. Z. deceptricalis Zeller, 1873, Z. gypsalis (Grote, 1880), Z. inconspicualis (Grote, 1883))
Zanclognatha yaeyamalis Owada, 1977
Zanclognatha zelleralis (Wocke, 1850)

References

External links

 
Taxa named by Julius Lederer